Paige Kouba (born January 8, 1994) is an American cross country and track athlete from Eugene, Oregon. Paige earned a 2016 NACAC U23 silver medal. As a long-distance runner she has been most successful in the steeplechase, earning National Collegiate Athletic Association (NCAA) All-American honors in that event in 2016 after finishing 7th at Outdoor Nationals. She was a 2016 Olympic Trials qualifier, the 2016 Ivy League champion in the steeplechase, and was also a member of Harvard's winning DMR at the 2016 Ivy League indoor championships.

High school
As a freshman, Paige Kouba won the 2008 Northwest regional meet in the Nike Cross Nationals series, and was a four time state cross country finalist. As a senior, Kouba won the 2012 Outdoor track and field Oregon School Activities Association 6A title in 800 meters.

NCAA
Competing in the Ivy League (2012–16), Kouba ran cross country and track and field and was captain of the 2015-16 Harvard University team that won in the 2016 Ivy League outdoor championships at Princeton University. Kouba placed 7th in steeplechase at 2016 NCAA Division I Outdoor Track and Field Championships.

Professional
Paige Kouba signed with Saucony in July 2016 and debuted at the 2016 United States Olympic Trials (track and field). Kouba represented the US in steeplechase by earning a silver medal in a time of 10:38.84 at 2016 NACAC Under-23 Championships in Athletics in El Salvador contributing to USA's 62 medals at this competition.

References

External links
 

Living people
1994 births
Sportspeople from Eugene, Oregon
Track and field athletes from Oregon
American female long-distance runners
American female steeplechase runners
Harvard Crimson women's track and field athletes
Harvard Crimson women's cross country runners
21st-century American women